The 2023 CONCACAF U-17 Championship will be an international football tournament that wil be held in Guatemala from 11 to 26 February 2023. The twenty participating national teams were required to register a squad of up to 20 players, of which two have to be goalkeepers. Only players in these squads are eligible to take part in the tournament. The tournament exclusively requires players to be born between 1 January 2006 and 31 December 2008 to be eligible, that is, they must be a maximun of 17 years old and at least 15 years old by the end of the calendar year in which the competition is played.

Each national team had to submit a provisional list of a minimum of 20 and a maximum of 60 players (including at least four goalkeepers) to CONCACAF no later than thirty days prior to the start of the tournament and players could be added before the final list deadline. The final list of up to 20 players per national team had to be submitted to CONCACAF by 1 February 2023, ten days before the opening match of the tournament. All players in the final list had to be chosen from the respective provisional list. In the event that a player on the submitted final list suffered a serious injury or illness up to 24 hours before the kick-off of his team's first match of the tournament, that player could be replaced, provided that it was approved by the CONCACAF Medical Committee. The replacement player must come from the provisional list and will be assigned the shirt number of the replaced player.

CONCACAF published the final lists on 6 February 2023.

The age listed for each player is on 11 February 2023, the first day of the tournament. A flag is included for coaches who are of a different nationality than their own national team.

Group E

Mexico
Mexico announced their squad of 20 players on 31 January 2023.

Head coach: Raúl Chabrand

Panama
Panama announced their squad of 20 players on 1 February 2023.

Head coach:  Mike Stump

Guatemala
Guatemala announced their squad of 20 players on 6 February 2023.

Head coach:  Marvin Cabrera

Curaçao
Curaçao announced their final squad of 20 players on 6 February 2023.

Head coach: Demy Rosario

Group F

United States
The United States announced their squad of 20 players on 3 February 2023. On 6 February 2023, goalkeeper Diego Kochen was replaced by Duran Ferree due to injury.

Head coach:  Gonzalo Segares

Canada
Canada announced a provisional squad of 23 players on 31 January 2023. The final squad of 20 players was confirmed by CONCACAF on 6 February 2023.

Head coach: Andrew Olivieri

Trinidad and Tobago
Trinidad and Tobago announced their squad of 20 players on 1 February 2023.

Head coach: Shawn Cooper

Barbados
Barbados announced their final squad of 20 players on 6 February 2023.

Head coach: Fabian Massiah

Group G

Costa Rica
Costa Rica announced their squad of 20 players on 3 February 2023.

Head coach: Erick Rodríguez

Jamaica
Jamaica announced their squad of 20 players on 1 February 2023.

Head coach: Merron Gordon

Cuba
The Cuba squad of 20 players was confirmed by CONCACAF on 6 February 2023.

Head coach: Sandro Sevillano

Guadeloupe
Guadeloupe announced their squad of 20 players on 3 February 2023.

Head coach: Richard Guyon

Group H

Honduras
Honduras announced their squad of 20 players on 4 February 2023.

Head coach: Israel Canales

Haiti
Haiti announced their 60-man provisional squad on 23 December 2022, which was reduced to 28 players on 16 January 2023. The final squad of 20 players was confirmed by CONCACAF on 6 February 2023. However, the Haitian Football Federation announced an updated list on 9 February 2023 with defender Danley Felix and forward Micah Williams being replaced by Kaief Tomlison and Yuri Guboglo respectively.

Head coach: Angelo Jean Baptiste

El Salvador
The El Salvador squad of 20 players was confirmed by CONCACAF on 6 February 2023, and later announced by the Salvadoran Football Federation on 9 February 2023.

Head coach: Juan Carlos Serrano

Suriname
The Suriname squad of 20 players was confirmed by CONCACAF on 6 February 2023.

Head coach: Aldrin de Baas

Knockout stage

Bermuda
Bermuda announced a 23-man provisional list on 25 January 2023. The final list of 20 players was announced on 2 February 2023.

Head coach: Cecoy Robinson

Dominican Republic
Dominican Republic announced their squad of 20 players on 1 February 2023.

Head coach: Mariano Pérez Tejada

Nicaragua
The Nicaragua final squad of 20 players was confirmed by CONCACAF on 6 February 2023. However, the Nicaraguan Football Federation announced an updated list of 19 players on 15 February 2023 with midfielder Lucíano Lanzas being ruled out from the squad and defender Gabriel Goussen and midfielder Daniel Miranda being replaced by Gian Lucas Moretti and Luis Carrión respectively.

Head coach: Tyron Acevedo

Puerto Rico
Puerto Rico announced their final squad of 20 players on 4 February 2023.

Head coach: Marco Vélez

References 

CONCACAF U-17 Championship squads